Oligolimax annularis is a species of gastropods belonging to the family Vitrinidae.

The species is found in Southern Europe and Western Asia.

References

Vitrinidae